The 2004 Saarland state election was held on 5 September 2004 to elect the members of the Landtag of Saarland. The incumbent Christian Democratic Union (CDU) government led by Minister-President Peter Müller retained its majority and continued in office.

Parties
The table below lists parties represented in the previous Landtag of Saarland.

Opinion polling

Election result

|-
! colspan="2" | Party
! Votes
! %
! +/-
! Seats 
! +/-
! Seats %
|-
| bgcolor=| 
| align=left | Christian Democratic Union (CDU)
| align=right| 209,690
| align=right| 47.5
| align=right| 2.0
| align=right| 27
| align=right| 1
| align=right| 52.9
|-
| bgcolor=| 
| align=left | Social Democratic Party (SPD)
| align=right| 136,224
| align=right| 30.8
| align=right| 13.6
| align=right| 18
| align=right| 7
| align=right| 35.3
|-
| bgcolor=| 
| align=left | Alliance 90/The Greens (Grüne)
| align=right| 24,830
| align=right| 5.6
| align=right| 2.4
| align=right| 3
| align=right| 3
| align=right| 5.9
|-
| bgcolor=| 
| align=left | Free Democratic Party (FDP)
| align=right| 22,842
| align=right| 5.2
| align=right| 2.6
| align=right| 3
| align=right| 3
| align=right| 6.9
|-
! colspan=8|
|-
| bgcolor=| 
| align=left | National Democratic Party (NPD)
| align=right| 17,590
| align=right| 4.0
| align=right| 4.0
| align=right| 0
| align=right| ±0
| align=right| 0
|-
| bgcolor=| 
| align=left | Family Party of Germany (FAMILIE)
| align=right| 13,106
| align=right| 3.0
| align=right| 2.0
| align=right| 0
| align=right| ±0
| align=right| 0
|-
| bgcolor=| 
| align=left | Party of Democratic Socialism (PDS)
| align=right| 10,240
| align=right| 2.3
| align=right| 1.5
| align=right| 0
| align=right| ±0
| align=right| 0
|-
| bgcolor=|
| align=left | Others
| align=right| 7,106
| align=right| 1.6
| align=right| 
| align=right| 0
| align=right| ±0
| align=right| 0
|-
! align=right colspan=2| Total
! align=right| 441,628
! align=right| 100.0
! align=right| 
! align=right| 51
! align=right| ±0
! align=right| 
|-
! align=right colspan=2| Voter turnout
! align=right| 
! align=right| 55.5
! align=right| 13.2
! align=right| 
! align=right| 
! align=right| 
|}

Sources
 The Federal Returning Officer

Saarland
2004